David Flaschen is a retired American soccer goalkeeper who spent played professionally in the North American Soccer League.  He is a partner with Castanea Partners, Inc.

Soccer
Flaschen attended Brown University, playing on the men's soccer team. The Chicago Sting selected Flaschen in the first round of the 1977 North American Soccer League draft. He played two seasons with the Sting.

Business
Flaschen earned a master's degree in entrepreneurial management from the Wharton School of Business. He was a founding member of the executive committee of the North American Soccer League (NASL) Players Association.  After leaving soccer, Flaschen embarked on a career in the business world focusing on financial services.  He spent ten years with Dun & Bradstreet and was the president of ACNielsen.  From 1995 to 1997, he was the chairman and CEO of Donnelly Marketing.  In 1997, Flaschen became the president and CEO of Thompson Financial.  In 2000, he moved to Flagship Ventures as a managing director.  In May 2005, he left Flagship Ventures to become a partner at Castanea Partners, Inc.

See also
Football in the United States
List of football clubs in the United States

References

External links
 NASL stats
 David Flaschen business career

1951 births
Living people
American soccer players
Brown Bears men's soccer players
Chicago Sting (NASL) players
North American Soccer League (1968–1984) players
Association football goalkeepers
Sportspeople from Summit, New Jersey
Soccer players from New Jersey
Businesspeople from New Jersey
Wharton School of the University of Pennsylvania alumni